Luton Hoo railway station was built by the Hertford, Luton & Dunstable Railway on the branch line between Hatfield and Dunstable. It opened in 1860 and was originally called New Mill End. In 1861 the railway was taken over by the Great Northern Railway. The name changed to Luton Hoo in 1891 and the station closed in 1965.The last passenger train, packed with enthusiasts, was hauled by Brush Type 2 (later Class 31) D5589 on 24 April 1965.

It served Luton Hoo house and the village of New Mill End. It was close to the Midland Railway station of Chiltern Green and the GNR line took a parallel course to the Midland north to Luton Bute Street.

The station building and platform still exist, sited next to a sewage works.

Routes

See also 

 List of closed railway stations in Britain

References

External links
Station history and photos

Former Great Northern Railway stations
Railway stations in Great Britain opened in 1860
Railway stations in Great Britain closed in 1965
Disused railway stations in Bedfordshire
Beeching closures in England
1860 establishments in England